The Paleobiology Database lists no known fossiliferous stratigraphic units in Dominica, Saint Kitts and Nevis, Saint Lucia, Saint Vincent and the Grenadines. The database also records no fossiliferous stratigraphic units within several regions of the Caribbean like the Archipelago of San Andrés, Providencia and Santa Catalina, Guadeloupe, Martinique, Bonaire, Saba, Sint Eustatius, and Nueva Esparta.

Antigua and Barbuda

The Bahamas

Barbados

Cuba

Dominican Republic

Grenada

Haiti

Jamaica

Trinidad and Tobago

Dependencies of France
The Paleobiology Database lists no known fossiliferous stratigraphic units in the French dependencies of St. Barthélemy or St. Martin.

Dependencies of the Netherlands 
The Paleobiology Database lists no known fossiliferous stratigraphic units in the Dutch dependencies of Aruba, Bonaire, Saba, Sint Eustatius and Sint Maarten.

Curaçao

Dependencies of the United Kingdom
The Paleobiology Database lists no known fossiliferous stratigraphic units in the British dependencies of the British Virgin Islands, the Cayman Islands, Montserrat, or the Turks and Caicos Islands.

Anguilla

Bermuda

Dependencies of the United States
The Paleobiology Database lists no known fossiliferous stratigraphic units in the American dependencies of Navassa Island or the United States Virgin Islands.

Puerto Rico

See also 

 Lists of fossiliferous stratigraphic units in the United States
 List of fossiliferous stratigraphic units in Florida
 List of fossiliferous stratigraphic units in Alabama
 List of fossiliferous stratigraphic units in Mississippi
 List of fossiliferous stratigraphic units in Louisiana
 List of fossiliferous stratigraphic units in Texas
 List of fossiliferous stratigraphic units in Mexico
 List of fossiliferous stratigraphic units in Central America
 List of fossiliferous stratigraphic units in Colombia
 List of fossiliferous stratigraphic units in Guyana
 List of fossiliferous stratigraphic units in Venezuela

References

Further reading 
Anguilla
 A. F. Budd, K.G. Johnson, and J.C. Edwards. 1995. Caribbean reef coral diversity during the Early to Middle Miocene: an Example from the Anguilla Formation. Coral Reefs 14(2):109-117

Antigua and Barbuda
 W. A. van den Bold. 1966. Ostracoda from the Antigua Formation (Oligocene, Lesser Antilles). Journal of Paleontology 40(5):1233-1236
 M. Brasier and J. Donahue. 1985. Barbuda - an emerging reef and lagoon complex on the edge of the Lesser Antilles island arc. Journal of the Geological Society of London 142:1101-1117
 A. P. Brown. 1913. Notes on the Geology of the Island of Antigua. Proceedings of the Academy of Natural Sciences, Philadelphia 584-616
 J. S. H. Collins and S. K. Donovan. 1995. A New Species of Necronectes (Decapoda) from the Upper Oligocene of Anitgua [sic]. Caribbean of Journal of Earth Science 31(1-2):122-127
 C. Flemming and D. A. McFarlane. 1998. New Caribbean Locality for the Extinct Great White Shark Carcharodon megalodon. Caribbean Journal of Science 34(3-4):317-318
 S. H. Frost and M. P. Weiss. 1979. Patch-reef communities and succession in the Oligocene of Antigua, West Indies. Geological Society America Bulletin 90:612-616

The Bahamas
 A. F. Budd and C. Manfrino. 2001. Coral assemblages and reef environments in the Bahamas Drilling Project cores. in R. N. Ginsburg, ed., Subsurface geology of a prograding carbonate platform margin, Great Bahama Bank: results of the Bahamas Drilling Project. SEPM Special Publication 70 41-59
 L. Gardiner. 2001. Stability of Late Pleistocene Reef Mollusks from San Salvador Island, Bahamas. Palaios 16:372-386
 B. J. Greenstein, L. A. Harris, and H. A. Curran. 1998. Comparison of recent coral life and death assemblages to Pleistocene reef communities: implications for rapid faunal replacement on recent reefs. Carbonates and Evaporites 13(1):23-31

Barbados
 J. S. H. Collins and S. F. Morris. 1976. Tertiary and Pleistocene crabs from Barbados and Trinidad. Palaeontology 19(1):107-131
 D. A. T. Harper and S. K. Donovan. 2007. Fossil brachiopods from the Pleistocene of the Antilles. Scripta Geologica 135:213-239
 
 J. W. Wells. 1934. Some fossil corals from the West Indies. Proceedings of the United States National Museum 83(2975):71-110

Bermuda
 D. R. Muhs, K. R. Simmons, and B. Steinke. 2002. Timing and warmth of the Last Interglacial period: new U-series evidence from Hawaii and Bermuda and a new fossil compilation for North America. Quaternary Science Reviews 21:1355-1383
 H. G. Richards, R. T. Abbott, and T. Skymer. 1969. The marine Pleistocene mollusks of Bermuda. Notulae Naturae 425:1-10

Cuba
 E. H. Colbert. 1969. A Jurassic pterosaur from Cuba. American Museum Novitates 2370:1-26
 G. A. Cooper. 1979. Tertiary and Cretaceous Brachiopods from Cuba and the Caribbean. Smithsonian Contributions to Paleobiology 37:1-45
 B. M. Cutress. 1980. Cretaceous and Tertiary Cidaroida (Echinodermata: Echinoidea) of the Caribbean Area. Bulletins of American Paleontology 77(309):1-221
 M. Fernandez and M. Iturralde-Vinent. 2000. An Oxfordian Ichthyosauria (Reptilia) from Vinales, western Cuba: paleobiogeographic significance. Journal of Vertebrate Paleontology 20(1):191-193
 Z. Gasparini. 2009. A new Oxfordian pliosaurid (Plesiosauria, Pliosauridae) in the Caribbean Seaway. Palaeontology 52(3):661-669
 Z. Gasparini, M. Fernandez, and M. Fuente. 2004. A new pterosaur from the Jurassic of Cuba. Palaeontology 47:919-927
 Z. Gasparini and M. Iturralde Vinent. 2001. Metriorhynchid crocodiles (Crocodyliformes) from the Oxfordian of Western Cuba. Neues Jahrbuch für Geologie und Paläontologie - Monatshefte 9:534-542
 A. Graham, D. Cozadd, A. Areces Mallea and N. O. Frederiksen. 2000. Studies in neotropical paleobotany. XIV. A palynoflora from the Middle Eocene Saramaguacan Formation of Cuba. American Journal of Botany 87(10):1526-1539
 R. Gutierrez Domech. 1981.  Voluntad Hidraulica 18(56):4-11
 M. Iturralde Vinent, G. Hubbell, and R. Rojas. 1996. Catalogue of Cuban fossil Elasmobranchii (Paleocene to Pliocene) and paleogeographic implications of their Lower to Middle Miocene occurrence. Boletín de la Sociedad Jamaicana de Geología 31:7-21
 M. Iturralde Vinent and M. A. Norell. 1996. Synopsis of Late Jurassic marine reptiles from Cuba. American Museum Novitates 3164:1-17
 R. D. E. MacPhee, M. A. Iturralde Vinent, and E. S. Gaffney. 2003. Domo de Zaza, an Early Miocene vertebrate locality in south-central Cuba, with notes on the tectonic evolution of Puerto Rico and the Mona Passage. American Museum Novitates 3394:1-42
 A. K. Miller and W. M. Furnish. 1956. An Aturia from eastern Cuba. Journal of Paleontology 30(5):1154
 A. K. Miller and H. R. Downs. 1950. Tertiary nautiloids of the Americas: supplement. Journal of Paleontology 24:1-18
 R. Myczynski. 1989. Ammonite biostratigraphy of the Tithonian of Western Cuba. Annales Societatis Geologorum Poloniae 59:43-125
 H. Pugaczewska. 1978. Jurassic pelecypods from Cuba. Acta Palaeontologica Polonica 23(2):163-186
 R. Rojas, M. Iturralde Vinent, and P. W. Skelton. 1995. Stratigraphy, composition and age of Cuban rudist-bearing deposits. Revista Mexicana de Ciencias Geológicas 12(2):272-291
 W. E. Schevill. 1950. An Upper Jurassic sepioid from Cuba. Journal of Paleontology 24(1):99-101
 C. E. Schweitzer, M. Iturralde-Vinent, J. L. Hetler and J. Velez-Juarbe. 2006. Oligocene and Miocene decapods (Thalassinidea and Brachyura) from the Caribbean. Annals of Carnegie Museum 75(2):111-136
 N. F. Sohl and H. A. Kollmann. 1985. Cretaceous Actaeonellid Gastropods from the Western Hemisphere. United States Geological Survey Professional Paper 1304:1-104
 D. Thies. 1989. Lepidotes gloriae, sp. nov. (Actinopterygii: Semionotiformes) from the Late Jurassic of Cuba. Journal of Vertebrate Paleontology 9(1):18-40
 A. Torre. 1960. Notas sobre rudistas [Notes about rudists]. Memorias de la Sociedad Cubana de Historia Natural 25(1):51-64
 A. de la Torre. 1949. Hallazgo de un hueso de dinosaurio terrestre en el Jurásico de Viñales, Pinar del Rio, Cuba. Universidad de La Habana 1-19
 L. S. Varona. 1972. Un Dugongido del Mioceno de Cuba (Mammalia: Sirenia). Sociedad de Ciencias Naturales La Salle: Caracas, Venezuela Memoria 91(32):5-19
 T. W. Vaughan. 1919. Fossil corals from central America, Cuba, and Porto Rico, with an account of the American Tertiary, Pleistocene, and Recent coral reefs. Smithsonian Institution Bulletin 103:189-524
 H. E. Vokes and E. H. Vokes. 1968. Variation in the genus Orthaulax (Mollusca: Gastropoda). Tulane Studies in Geology and Paleontology 6(2):71-84

Curaçao
 P. Jung. 1974. Eocene Mollusks from Curacao, West Indies. Verhandl. Naturf. Ges. Basel 84(1):483-500
 J. M. Pandolfi. 2001. Community structure of Pleistocene coral reefs of Curacao, Netherlands Antilles. Ecological Monographs 71(1):49-67
 J. M. Pandolfi, G. Llewellyn, and J. B. C. Jackson. 1999. Pleistocene reef environments, constituent grains, and coral community structure: Curacao, Netherlands Antilles. Coral Reefs 18:107-122
 

Dominican Republic
 A. G. Beu. 2010. Neogene Tonnoidean Gastropods of Tropical and South America; contributions to the Dominican Republic and Panama Paleontology Projects and Uplift of the Central American Isthmus. Bulletins of American Paleontology (377-378)1-550
 A. F. Budd and K. G. Johnson. 1999. Neogene Paleontology in the northern Dominican Republic 19: The family Faviidae (Anthozoa, Scleractinia) part II: The genera Caulastraea, Favia, Diploria, Thysanus, Hadrophyllia, Manicina and Colpophyllia. Bulletins of American Paleontology 356:1-83
 S. D. Cairns and J. W. Wells. 1987. Neogene paleontology in the northern Dominican Republic, 5. The suborders Caryophylliina and Dendrophylliina (Anthozoa, Scleractinia). Bulletins of American Paleontology 93(328):23-43 
 R. Myczynski and M. Iturralde Vinent. 2005. The Late Lower Albian Invertebrate Fauna of the Río Hatillo Formation of Pueblo Viejo, Dominican Republic. Caribbean Journal of Science 41(4):782-796
 T. W. Vaughan, W. Cooke, D. D. Condit, C. P. Ross, W. P. Woodring and F. C. Calkins. 1921. A geological reconnaissance of the Dominican Republic. Geological Survey of the Dominican Republic Memoir 1:1-268
 H. E. Vokes and E. H. Vokes. 1968. Variation in the genus Orthaulax (Mollusca: Gastropoda). Tulane Studies in Geology and Paleontology 6(2):71-84

Grenada
 P. Jung. 1971. Fossil mollusks from Carriacou, West Indies. Bulletins of American Paleontology 61(269):1-262
 R. W. Portell, G. Hubbell, S. Donovan, D.A.T. Harper, and R. Pickerill. 2008. Miocene sharks in the Kendeace and Grand Bay formations of Carriacou, The Grenadines, Lesser Antilles. Caribbean Journal of Science 44(3):279-286

Haiti
 J. Butterlin. 1960. Géologie générale et régionale de la République D'Haiti. Travaux et Mémoires de L'Institute des Hautes Estudes de L'Amérique Latine 6
 W. Jones. 1918. A Geological Reconnaissance in Haiti a Contribution to Antillean Geology. Journal of Geology 26(8):728-752
 M. J. Rathbun. 1923. Fossil Crabs from the Republic of Haiti. Proceedings of the United States National Museum 63:1-6
 H. E. Vokes and E. H. Vokes. 1968. Variation in the genus Orthaulax (Mollusca: Gastropoda). Tulane Studies in Geology and Paleontology 6(2):71-84

 01
 
Caribbean
Caribbean
Caribbean geology-related lists